The 2016 United States Senate election in Colorado was held November 8, 2016, to elect a member of the United States Senate to represent the State of Colorado, concurrently with the 2016 U.S. presidential election, as well as other elections to the United States Senate in other states and elections to the United States House of Representatives and various state and local elections.

Major party candidates can qualify for the ballot through party assemblies or by petition.  To qualify by assembly, a candidate must receive at least 30 percent of the vote from the party's state assembly.  To qualify by petition, the candidate must file at least 1,500 signatures from each congressional district by April 4, 2016.

Incumbent Democratic Senator Michael Bennet won re-election to a second full term in office. Bennet's main challenger was Republican nominee Darryl Glenn, an El Paso County commissioner. Glenn won a crowded, five-way Republican primary in June. Three other candidates were on the ballot: former Eagle County Commissioner Arn Menconi was the Green Party nominee; Lily Tang Williams was the Libertarian Party nominee; and Unity Party of America Chairman Bill Hammons was the Unity Party nominee.

Background 
Democratic U.S. Senator Ken Salazar resigned in January 2009 to become United States Secretary of the Interior and Governor Bill Ritter appointed Bennet, the Superintendent of Denver Public Schools, to replace him. Bennet was elected to a full term in 2010, defeating Republican Ken Buck by 48.1% to 46.4%.

Democratic primary 
Incumbent Senator Michael Bennet was unopposed for renomination.

Candidates

Declared 
 Michael Bennet, incumbent U.S. Senator

Results

Republican primary 

The Colorado Republican Party State Assembly was held April 9, 2016. Darryl Glenn won the convention with 70% of the vote. Robert Blaha, Jack Graham, Jon Keyser, and Ryan Frazier sought to qualify for the ballot by petition instead of through the State Assembly.

Glenn won the June primary with about 37.5% of the vote in the crowded, five-candidate Republican primary field.

Candidate controversies 
In early May, the Denver ABC affiliate uncovered over 10 forged voter signatures on the petition which placed Republican candidate Jon Keyser on the June Republican primary ballot.  The circulator who forged the signatures was arrested for 34 felonies.  A late May lawsuit claiming at least 60 forged signatures based on the analysis of a handwriting expert and challenging Keyser's placement on the primary ballot was dismissed because it didn't fall within the five-day window to challenge a ballot placement.

When asked on-camera about the forgeries, Keyser didn't address the issue and proceeded to inform the interviewer that Keyser's dog was larger than the interviewer.

In early June, when asked by a fellow Republican candidate and a retired air force lieutenant colonel whether Keyser received his Bronze Star for work on a software program or for "kicking in doors" in combat as "represented to the community", Keyser refused to answer the question and claimed he had "no idea" what software program his rival was talking about.  Yet, according to the article announcing Keyser's citation, Keyser "developed and implemented a unique and effective technique to provide critical force protection and situational-awareness data to ground counter-terrorism operations."

In August 2014, Republican candidate Jack Graham was fired as Colorado State University Athletic Director for reasons that were not specified, though he would continue to be paid through the November 2016 election.

Candidates

Declared 
 Robert Blaha, businessman and candidate for Colorado's 5th congressional district in 2012
 Ryan Frazier, former Aurora city councilman, nominee for Colorado's 7th congressional district in 2010, and candidate for mayor of Aurora in 2011 (withdrew)
 Darryl Glenn, El Paso County commissioner
 Jack Graham, businessman and former Colorado State University athletic director
 Jon Keyser, former state representative

Withdrew 
 Greg Lopez, former director of the Small Business Administration Colorado District, former mayor of Parker and candidate for Colorado Senate in 2000

Rejected at convention 
 Charlie Ehler, retired air force computer programmer and Tea Party activist
 Jerry Eller, former insurance and real estate agent
 Tom Janich, former Brighton School board-member and perennial candidate
 Michael Kinlaw, mortgage broker
 Peggy Littleton, El Paso County commissioner and former Colorado State Board of Education member
 Jerry Natividad, businessman
 Tim Neville, state senator
 Donald Rosier, Jefferson County commissioner
 Erik Underwood, former congressional staffer

Declined 
 Christian Anschutz, real estate developer
 Wil Armstrong, businessman, candidate for Colorado's 6th congressional district in 2008 and son of former U.S. Senator William L. Armstrong
 Dan Caplis, radio host
 Dan Domenico, former Solicitor General of Colorado
 Owen Hill, state senator and candidate for the U.S. Senate in 2014
 Steve Laffey, former mayor of Cranston, Rhode Island, candidate for U.S. Senate from Rhode Island in 2006, and candidate for Colorado's 4th congressional district in 2014
 Gale Norton, former United States Secretary of the Interior, former Attorney General of Colorado, and candidate for the U.S. Senate in 1996
 Walker Stapleton, Colorado State Treasurer
 Amy Stephens, former state representative and candidate for the U.S. Senate in 2014
 Brian Watson, real estate developer
 Rob Witwer, former state representative
 George Brauchler, Arapahoe County District Attorney
 Ken Buck, U.S. Representative and nominee for the U.S. Senate in 2010 (running for re-election)
 Bill Cadman, president of the Colorado Senate
 Cynthia Coffman, Colorado Attorney General
 Mike Coffman, U.S. Representative, former Secretary of State of Colorado and former Colorado State Treasurer (running for reelection)
 Mike Kopp, former state senator and candidate for Governor in 2014
 Josh Penry, former state senator
 Ellen Roberts, state senator
 Doug Robinson, businessman
 Mark Scheffel, Majority Leader of the Colorado Senate
 Ray Scott, state senator
 Justin Smith, Larimer County Sheriff
 Jerry Sonnenberg, state senator
 Scott Tipton, U.S. Representative (running for re-election)

Endorsements

Results 

Darryl Glenn won the general primary on June 28 and went on to face the other candidates in the November election.

Third party and independent candidates

Declared 
 Bill Hammons (Unity Party), chairman and founder of the Unity Party of America
 Arn Menconi (Green Party), former Eagle County Commissioner and founder of SOS Outreach
 Gary Swing (Boiling Frog Party), promoter and perennial candidate
 Lily Tang Williams (Libertarian), former chair of the Libertarian Party of Colorado and candidate for the state house in 2014

Endorsements

General election

Debates

Predictions

Polling

Graphical summary

with Scott Tipton

with Mike Coffman

with Cynthia Coffman

Results

References

External links 
Official campaign websites
 Michael Bennet (D) for Senate
 Darryl Glenn (R) for Senate
 Lily Tang Williams (L) for Senate
 Arn Menconi (G) for Senate
 Bill Hammons (U) for Senate
 Gary Swing (B) for Senate

2016
Colorado
United States Senate
Michael Bennet